HNoMS Æger was a Rendel gunboat built for the Royal Norwegian Navy at Karljohansvern Naval Yard in 1894, as the last of the 2. class gunboats. Larger than the other, older 2. class gunboats, Æger had a 38 mm (1.5 inch) armoured deck.

She was known as Padda ("The Toad") due to the way she looked, and was kept in the fleet until she was decommissioned in 1932.

References
 Naval history via Flix: KNM Aegir, retrieved 13 Feb 2006

Ships built in Horten
Gunboats of the Royal Norwegian Navy
1894 ships